The Hudson River National Estuarine Research Reserve is a National Estuarine Research Reserve in the state of New York.

Home to more than 200 species of fish, the Hudson River serves as a nursery ground for such important fish as sturgeon, striped bass and American shad. It also supports a corresponding abundance of other river-dependent wildlife, especially birds.

The river is profoundly influenced by the ocean's tides for over half its length, creating an estuary which stretches  and includes a wide range of wetland habitats. The reserve sites reflect this diversity, from the brackish marshes of Piermont to the slightly brackish wetlands of Iona Island, and the freshwater tidal mudflats and marshes of Tivoli Bays and Stockport Flats.

References
Hudson River National Estuarine Research Reserve - NY Department of Environmental Conservation 
 Hudson River National Estuarine Research Reserve - National Oceanic and Atmospheric Administration

External links
Official website of Hudson River National Estuarine Research Reserve

Hudson River
National Estuarine Research Reserves of the United States
Protected areas of Columbia County, New York
Protected areas of Dutchess County, New York
Protected areas of Rockland County, New York
Estuaries of New York (state)
Bodies of water of Columbia County, New York
Bodies of water of Dutchess County, New York
Bodies of water of Rockland County, New York